Anisynta dominula, the two-brand grass-skipper or dominula skipper, is a species of butterfly in the family Hesperiidae. It is found in Australia in the mountains of New South Wales, Tasmania and Victoria.

The larvae feed on Poa sieberana. The caterpillar is a dark green colour with a darker dorsal line and a black head. The caterpillar forms a shelter by joining several grass stems together with silk in the middle of a tussock where it lies and pupates.

The adult butterflies are dark brown in colour and identified by several white spots on each forewing, but the hindwings have arcs of white spots. Another identifying feature is the presence of chequered termen to both surfaces each wing, which is broader in the females. The males are differentiated from the females as they have a sex brand on the upper forewing surfaces consisting of a short diagonal black line. The wing span is about 3 cm.

Subspecies
Anisynta dominula dominula
Anisynta dominula drachmophora
Anisynta dominula draco
Anisynta dominula dyris
Anisynta dominula pria

External links
 Australian Caterpillars
 Australian Caterpillars and their Butterflies and Moths

Trapezitinae
Butterflies described in 1884
Butterflies of Australia